Kokorya (Kögörü) is a rural locality (a selo) and the administrative centre of Kokorinskoye Rural Settlement of Kosh-Agachsky District, the Altai Republic, Russia. The population is 941 as of 2016. There are 9 streets.

Geography 
Kokorya is located in the north-east of the Chui steppe, between the rivers Yustyd and Kyzylshin, 28 km southeast of Kosh-Agach (the district's administrative centre) by road. Zhana-Aul is the nearest rural locality.

Ethnicity 
The village is inhabited by Telengits and Altaians.

References 

Rural localities in Kosh-Agachsky District